Taber may refer to:

Places
Taber, Alberta, town in Canada
Municipal District of Taber, a municipal district in Alberta, Canada
Taber Airport, near the town in Alberta, Canada
Fort Taber, Civil War-era fort and park in Massachusetts, USA

Other
Taber (surname), including a list of people with the name
Taber's, a medical dictionary
Taber MacCallum (born 1964), American space scientist

See also
Cardston-Taber-Warner, a provincial electoral district in Alberta, Canada
Tabor (disambiguation)